The 1995 Monte Carlo Rally was the 63rd Rallye Automobile de Monte-Carlo. It was won by Carlos Sainz.

It was part of the  World Rally Championship.

Entry list

Results

References

External links 

Monte Carlo Rally
1995 in Monégasque sport
1995 in French motorsport
1995 World Rally Championship season